"Reality" is a song by Belgian DJ and record producer Lost Frequencies, it was written by Felix de Laet, Janieck van de Polder, and Radboud Miedema. It became available for digital download on 18 May 2015. The song features vocals by Dutch singer and actor Janieck Devy, it topped the charts in over 10 countries.

Charts

Weekly charts

Year-end charts

Certifications

References

2015 songs
2015 singles
Lost Frequencies songs
Number-one singles in Austria
Ultratop 50 Singles (Flanders) number-one singles
Ultratop 50 Singles (Wallonia) number-one singles
SNEP Top Singles number-one singles
Number-one singles in Germany
Number-one singles in Hungary
Number-one singles in Poland
Tropical house songs
Songs written by Janieck Devy
Songs written by Lost Frequencies